"All She Wrote" is a song by New Zealand band Six60, released as a single in February 2021, during their Six60 Saturdays tour. The song was a hit for the band, reaching number one in New Zealand.

Background and composition

The band first wrote the chords for the song on an old guitar, which only had three remaining strings. The song was produced by Malay, and the song's lyrics were inspired by acceptance.

Release and promotion 

The song was debuted live on 16 January 2021 during the band's first performance of the Six60 Saturdays tour of New Zealand, and was released just prior to the final performance of the tour in Hamilton.

Music video

The song's music video features a number of cameos by New Zealand celebrities, including sportspeople Dan Carter and Joseph Parker, politician Chlöe Swarbrick, musicians Dave Dobbyn and Mitch James, and newscasters Mike McRoberts and Samantha Hayes. The video's concept was inspired by the idea of musicians testing their music through car speakers before release, and is an homage to "How Bizarre" (1995) by OMC.

Critical reception

The song was nominated for the 2021 Aotearoa Music Award for Single of the Year award.

Credits and personnel
Credits adapted from Tidal.

Jacob Dutton – songwriting
Marlon Gerbes – songwriting
James Ho – production, songwriting
Dave Kutch – mastering engineer
Paul Shelton – songwriting
Six60 – performer

Charts

Year-end charts

Certifications

References

2021 singles
2021 songs
New Zealand songs
Six60 songs
Songs written by Malay (record producer)